KASK (91.5 FM) is a non-commercial American radio station broadcasting a Christian talk and teaching format, licensed by the Federal Communications Commission (FCC) to serve the community of Fairfield, California.  As of January 2009, KASK is owned by Continuous Bible Talk.

History
The station was first licensed to begin broadcasting as KASZ on February 7, 1997.  On May 23, 1997, the station changed its call sign to the current KASK.

KASK was formerly owned and operated by The Doug Matthews Group in Las Cruces, New Mexico and ceased broadcasting in the early 1990s after a venture into independent television (KASK-TV) failed and forced the company into bankruptcy. The station's format during the 1970s and 1980s was Adult Contemporary and used a reel-to-reel automation system with live assist cutaways for news, weather, and sports. The station's frequency was 103.1 FM.

References

External links

ASK
Radio stations established in 1997
Fairfield, California